Ioannes V (Iōannēs E') may refer to:

 Patriarch John V of Constantinople (ruled 669–675)
 John V Palaiologos (1332–1391)

See also
 John V (disambiguation)